Holger Freitag (born 8 October 1963) is an East German former ski jumper.

Career
In the World Cup he finished six times among the top 10, his best result being a victory from Harrachov in January 1983. He is the father of German ski jumper Richard Freitag.

World Cup

Standings

Wins

External links

1963 births
Living people
People from Erzgebirgskreis
German male ski jumpers
Olympic ski jumpers of East Germany
Ski jumpers at the 1984 Winter Olympics
Sportspeople from Saxony